James Maurice Daniels (August 26, 1924 – June 12, 2016) was a Canadian Oxford-educated physicist, inventor, author, and former university professor. He was a physics professor at the University of British Columbia, from 1953 to 1960, then a year as  a visiting professor at Instituto de Fisica J.A. Balseiro in Bariloche, Argentina, before becoming a professor of Physics at the University of Toronto. He also served 5 years as Chairman of the department.  He retired as Professor Emeritus in the late 1980s to live near Princeton, where he had been a visiting senior researcher in 1984–85.

Education 
Daniels received his degrees from Jesus College, Oxford; a BA in 1948, an MA in 1949 and DPhil in 1952.

Awards and honors 

 Fellow of the Royal Society of Canada
 Fellow of the Institute of Physics (London)
 Chartered Physicist (United  Kingdom)
 Guggenheim Guggenheim Fellowship (1978).
 Alfred P. Sloan Fellow (1963)
 ICI Research Fellow (1952)
 Nuffield Research Fellow (1951)
 Member of the Canadian Association of Physicists and the American Physical Society.

He is the inventor in three US patents:

He is the author of the book  Oriented Nuclei 

He authored many scientific articles in areas such as nuclear orientation, and applications of Mossbauer spectroscopy to magnetic materials and minerals. For example:  He specialized in low temperature physics and oriented spin of nuclei especially at low temperatures. He also researched Mossbauer spectra and their applications to crystallography.

He was the PhD supervisor of several physicists who became university professors in Canada, including: Gilles Lamarche (UBC-phD, University of Ottawa), Marcel Leblanc (UBC-PhD, University of Ottawa), Denis Rancourt (Toronto-PhD, University of Ottawa), and Stephen Julian (Toronto-PhD, University of Toronto). He was also notable for his capability to design and implement experiments, and in many visiting professor positions, helped design and implement the equipment necessary.

Later life
Dr. James Daniels died on June 12, 2016 in Summit, New Jersey.

References

1924 births
2016 deaths
Canadian inventors
Canadian physicists
Alumni of Jesus College, Oxford
Academic staff of the University of British Columbia
Academic staff of the University of Toronto
Canadian expatriates in the United Kingdom